The Centre Group is a party group on the Nordic Council. It consists of various political families, including Christian Democrats, Liberals, Agrarians and Greens.

Members
The member organizations of the Centre Group are:

The liberal parties of Denmark, Sweden and Norway, the centre parties of Finland and Sweden, the Swedish People's Party of Finland and the Reform Party are members of the ALDE and Renew Europe; the Christian Democrats of Denmark, Finland and Sweden are members of the EPP and the European People's Party group; the green parties are members of the European Green Party and Greens–EFA, while Future of Åland is a member of the European Free Alliance.

Elected representatives of Member Parties

European institutions

References

Pan-European political parties
European People's Party
Alliance of Liberals and Democrats for Europe Party
European Green Party
Centrist parties in Europe
Green parties in Europe
Christian democratic parties in Europe
Liberal parties in Europe
Scandinavian political parties
Party groups in the Nordic Council